Adam Wildavsky (born March 24, 1960) is an American bridge player from Jackson Heights, New York.

Wildavsky began playing bridge while in high school in Oakland, California and continued while he earned a degree in computer science from MIT.

Bridge accomplishments

Wins

 North American Bridge Championships (5)
 Lebhar IMP Pairs (1) 2008 
 Fast Open Pairs (1) 2008 
 Blue Ribbon Pairs (2) 1992, 1997 
 Reisinger (1) 2002

Runners-up

 North American Bridge Championships
 Lebhar IMP Pairs (1) 1996 
 Fast Open Pairs (2) 2004, 2006 
 Nail Life Master Open Pairs (1) 2011 
 Roth Open Swiss Teams (1) 2010 
 Mitchell Board-a-Match Teams (2) 2009, 2011

References

External links
 

1960 births
American contract bridge players
MIT School of Engineering alumni
People from Jackson Heights, Queens
Living people
Place of birth missing (living people)
People from Oakland, California